Jack Gibbens (born November 24, 1998) is an American football linebacker for the Tennessee Titans of the National Football League (NFL). He played college football at Abilene Christian and Minnesota, and was signed by the Titans as an undrafted free agent in 2022.

Early life and education
Gibbens was born on November 24, 1998, in Bulverde, Texas. He attended Smithson Valley High School and graduated in 2017, before joining Abilene Christian University where he played football from 2017–2020.

As a freshman at Abilene Christian, Gibbens appeared in ten games as a linebacker and posted 27 tackles and an interception. He played in all 11 matches the following year and totaled 78 tackles, placing top-50 in the FCS in tackles-per-game. In 2019, as a junior, Gibbens recorded 104 tackles, 2.5 sacks and two interceptions. As a senior in 2020, he recorded 49 tackles while only playing in six games.

Gibbens transferred to the University of Minnesota for his final year of eligibility. As a fifth-year senior in 2021, he recorded a team-leading 92 tackles, broke up three passes and forced a single fumble while starting all 13 games.

Professional career
After going unselected in the 2022 NFL Draft, Gibbens was signed by the Tennessee Titans as an undrafted free agent. Although a fan favorite during the preseason, "Dr. Gibby," as he was nicknamed, was released at the final roster cuts and not initially re-signed to the practice squad. While a free agent in early September, Gibbens received a tryout from the Atlanta Falcons. He was eventually signed to the Titans practice squad on September 12. Gibbens was promoted to the active roster on December 10, and made his NFL debut in their game against the Jacksonville Jaguars one day later, appearing on 25 snaps. In week sixteen against the Houston Texas, he recorded eight total tackles, one pass deflection and his first career interception in the loss. The following week, against the Dallas Cowboys, Gibbens made his first career start and appeared on all 80 defensive snaps, recording 10 tackles.

References

1998 births
Living people
American football linebackers
Players of American football from Texas
People from Bulverde, Texas
Abilene Christian Wildcats football players
Minnesota Golden Gophers football players
Tennessee Titans players